Hershey Friedman (born 1950) is a Canadian billionaire businessman and philanthropist. His business concerns span the plastics packaging business and kosher meat in North America as well as luxury real estate development and Jewish books in Israel.

Early life
Hershey Friedman was born in 1950 in Montreal, Quebec. His parents owned a textile company. His father was paralysed in a car accident in 1960, when Friedman was ten years old. He has two brothers.

Friedman was raised as an Orthodox Jew. He was educated at Yeshivas Ner Yisroel near Baltimore, USA, and Beit Shraga in Monsey, New York. He later studied the law and accounting in Montreal.

Career
Friedman started his career by working for his family textile company. By 1982, he acquired a plastics packaging business. By 2014, Friedman told The Jerusalem Post, "we are the largest in North America, packaging Hershey’s chocolates, Pepsi, Nestle, Elle Candy, the famous Entenmann’s donuts, McCain’s fries, as well as larger and smaller companies internationally and locally. We’re also probably the largest bread-bag producer."

Friedman purchased Azorim , a real estate development company which builds luxury apartments in Israel, from Shaya Boymelgreen in 2009-2011. The company built the Beeri-Nehardea Tower; it also planned to build the Elite Tower, but the project was discontinued.

Friedman purchased Agriprocessors, a kosher meat company based in Iowa, USA in 2009. Shortly after, he renamed it Agri Star Meat and Poultry. All employees are E-Verified.

Friedman is the co-owner of "Dun & Bradstreet, Fourier, which produces solutions for scientific education, and CVD, a development company."

Friedman is a billionaire.

Philanthropy
Friedman is a philanthropist who contributes to charities, hospitals and yeshivas.
He also invests heavily in funding large-scale projects of publishing holy seforim and is the chief patron of the Babylonian Talmud (Vilna Edition Shas), the Jerusalem Talmud, Shulchan Aruch and Mishna Berura published by the Oz Vehadar institute. These editions are called 'Friedman edition'. The cost of the Babylonian Talmud project was over $20 million.

Personal life
Friedman married Raisy Stuhl in Montreal in 1975, and they have six married children, all of whom work for his businesses.

Friedman resides in Montreal, Quebec, Canada. He spends one week a month in Israel, and always stays at the Hilton Tel Aviv.

References

Living people
1950 births
20th-century Canadian businesspeople
21st-century Canadian businesspeople
Businesspeople from Montreal
Canadian billionaires
Canadian Orthodox Jews
Jewish Canadian philanthropists
Philanthropists from Quebec
Patrons of literature